"42nd Street" is the title song from the 1933 Warner Bros. backstage musical film 42nd Street, with music by Harry Warren and lyrics by Al Dubin.  The song was published in 1932.  It is the finale of the film, where it was sung by Ruby Keeler, Dick Powell and ensemble.  It was used again in 1980 when the film was adapted as a long-running Broadway musical. In 2004 the song placed #97 in AFI's 100 Years...100 Songs survey of the top tunes in American cinema.

Cover versions
Popular recordings in 1933 were by Don Bestor & His Orchestra (vocal by Dudley Mecum) and by Hal Kemp & His Orchestra (vocal by Skinnay Ennis).
The Boswell Sisters also recorded the song on April 11, 1933, for Brunswick Records (catalog No. 6545A).
Joseph Robichaux and his New Orleans Rhythm Boys recorded a very hot jazz instrumental version on August 25, 1933.
Diana Krall included the song on her album Stepping Out (1993).
Mel Torme – Mel Tormé Sings Sunday in New York & Other Songs About New York (1964).
Frankie Vaughan – Love Hits and High Kicks (1985).

In popular culture
The music inspired the title song to the Indian Hindi language film Sabse Bada Rupaiya.  The song "Sabse Bada Rupaiya" would be used again in another Indian "Bollywood" film Bluffmaster (2005).

The song was used in the 1940 Warner Bros. film City for Conquest, starring James Cagney and Ann Sheridan when it was played at various times throughout the picture.

Warner Bros. cartoon musical director Carl Stalling often used the song in cartoons in urban settings. In Daffy Doodles, it is used in a scene involving a subway train.

The song was used in the SyFy show Warehouse 13 in the series finale, where the agents of the mysterious warehouse that collects supernaturally charged artifacts are plagued by the effects of the lighted marquee sign from the premiere of 42nd Street. The marquee causes people to tap dance involuntarily. The agents are then surrounded by show girls tap dancing as they sing "42nd Street." Two more supernaturally charged artifacts, Bubsy Berkley's flask and a tin pan from 'Tin Pan Alley', are combined with a show stopping musical number to neutralize the marquee sign and magically dismiss the legions of showgirls.  https://warehouse13.fandom.com/wiki/42nd_Street_Film_Marquee

References

Film theme songs
Songs about streets
Songs with music by Harry Warren
Songs with lyrics by Al Dubin
1932 songs
1930s jazz standards